Y Sayeed Ahmed is a leader of the Indian National Congress and  Former Chairman of the State minority cell of the Karnataka Pradesh Congress Committee (KPCC).

Political career 
Sayeed Ahmed contested in Karnataka Legislative Assembly election as the candidate from the Congress Party in 1999 from Binnypet (Vidhana Sabha Constituency) and in 2008 from Chamrajpet (Vidhana Sabha constituency) . He was also declared as the official Congress Lok Sabha candidate from Bangalore North Parliamentary Constituency in place of late veteran Congress Leader C.K. Jaffer Sharief in 1996. On 2 July 2015, Y Sayeed Ahmed was appointed as the chairman of the Minority Department of Karnataka Pradesh Congress Committee (KPCC).

Positions held

References 

Indian National Congress politicians from Karnataka
Living people
Year of birth missing (living people)